Eichsfeld – Nordhausen – Kyffhäuserkreis is an electoral constituency (German: Wahlkreis) represented in the Bundestag. It elects one member via first-past-the-post voting. Under the current constituency numbering system, it is designated as constituency 189. It is located in northern Thuringia, comprising the districts of Nordhausen, Eichsfeld, and Kyffhäuserkreis.

Eichsfeld – Nordhausen – Kyffhäuserkreis was created for the inaugural 1990 federal election after German reunification. Since 1994, it has been represented by Manfred Grund of the Christian Democratic Union (CDU).

Geography
Eichsfeld – Nordhausen – Kyffhäuserkreis is located in northern Thuringia. As of the 2021 federal election, it comprises the districts of Eichsfeld, Nordhausen, and Kyffhäuserkreis.

History
Eichsfeld – Nordhausen – Kyffhäuserkreis was created after German reunification in 1990, then known as Nordhausen – Worbis – Heiligenstadt. In the 2002 election, it was named Eichsfeld – Nordhausen. In the 2005 through 2013 elections, it was named Eichsfeld – Nordhausen – Unstrut-Hainich-Kreis I. It acquired its current name in the 2017 election. In the 1990 through 1998 elections, it was constituency 296 in the numbering system. In the 2002 and 2005 elections, it was number 190. Since the 2009 election, it has been number 189.

Originally, the constituency comprised the districts of Nordhausen, Worbis, and Heiligenstadt. In the 2002 election, it comprised the districts of Nordhausen and Eichsfeld. In the 2005 through 2013 elections, it comprised the districts of Nordhausen and Eichsfeld as well as the municipalities of Mühlhausen, Anrode, Dünwald, and Unstruttal and the Verwaltungsgemeinschaft of Hildebrandshausen/Lengenfeld unterm Stein from the Unstrut-Hainich-Kreis district. It acquired its current borders in the 2017 election.

Members
The constituency was first represented by Gerhard Reddemann of the Christian Democratic Union (CDU) from 1990 to 1994. Manfred Grund of the CDU was elected in 1994, and re-elected in 1998, 2002, 2005, 2009, 2013, 2017, and 2021.

Election results

2021 election

2017 election

2013 election

2009 election

References

Federal electoral districts in Thuringia
1990 establishments in Germany
Constituencies established in 1990
Eichsfeld (district)
Nordhausen (district)
Kyffhäuserkreis